The  is a regional railway line in Shiga Prefecture operated by Ohmi Railway. It connects Hikone city and Taga town.

History
 8 March 1914: Line opens.
 12 March 1925: Line is electrified at 600 VDC, this is being increased to 1500 VDC in 1928 in conjunction with the voltage increase on the Main Line.
 October 1943: Services to Tsuchida Station (between Takamiya and Taga) suspended.
 October 1953: Tsuchida Station is closed.
 11 May 1976: Driver-only operation commences.
 1 April 1998: Taga Station renamed Taga Taisha-mae Station.
 15 March 2008: Screen Station opens.

Rolling stock
 220 series single-car EMUs

Stations

Attractions along the line
Taga-taisha shrine
Taga Line was built for worshippers of Taga Taisha shrine.
Kirin Brewery Company Shiga Factory
Bridgestone Hikone Factory
Dainippon Screen Mfg (Electronics company) Hikone Area Office
Maruho (Pharmaceutical company) Hikone Factory

See also
 List of railway lines in Japan

References

 This article incorporates material from the corresponding article in the Japanese Wikipedia

External links
  

Rail transport in Shiga Prefecture
Railway lines in Japan
Railway lines opened in 1914
1067 mm gauge railways in Japan
Ohmi Railway